Bennetts Associates is a British firm of architects. It was founded in 1987 by Denise Bennetts and her partner Rab Bennetts, who had previously worked for Ove Arup & Partners. The total shareholding of Bennetts Associates was transferred to an Employee Ownership Trust in 2016.

National Life Stories conducted an oral history interview (C467/103) with Rab Bennetts in 2012-13 for its Architects Lives' collection held by the British Library.

Projects 

Projects undertaken by the firm have included:

 1994: PowerGen headquarters, Coventry
 2002: Loch Lomond Gateway and Orientation Centre, Dumbartonshire
 2003: Hampstead Theatre, Camden, London
 2009: Elizabeth II Court, Hampshire County Council Offices, Winchester
 2010: Mint Hotel, Tower of London
 2010: Royal Shakespeare Theatre, Stratford-upon-Avon
 2011: Mint Hotel, Amsterdam
2018: Bayes Centre at the University of Edinburgh
2021: Crossrail suburban stations, West London

References

External links 
 Bennetts Associates Web Site

Architecture firms of the United Kingdom
Companies established in 1987
Architecture firms based in London